Cow Marsh Old School Baptist Church, also known as Mount Moriah Baptist Church, is a historic Baptist church near Sandtown, Kent County, Delaware. It was built in 1872, and is a simple one-story, rectangular frame building.  It is sheathed in clapboard, has a low gable roof, and features corner pilasters.

It was added to the National Register of Historic Places in 1976.

References

Baptist churches in Delaware
Churches on the National Register of Historic Places in Delaware
Churches completed in 1872
19th-century Baptist churches in the United States
Churches in Kent County, Delaware
National Register of Historic Places in Kent County, Delaware